Yulian Radionov (Bulgarian: Юлиян Радионов) (born July 1, 1979) is a retired Bulgarian professional basketball player and former head coach of BC Yambol in the Bulgarian League. He was playing as a point guard. He is well known as Yuli among his team mates.

Biography
Yuli was born in Burgas, and began his career on the local team - BC Chernomorets. He was a national player and one of the best point guards in Bulgaria and he played at EuroBasket 2005. Unfortunately, because of injuries he has missed a lot of matches for Bulgaria's national team.

After leaving BC Chernomorets he played for PBC Lukoil Academic, BC Levski Sofia, BC Spartak Pleven, Euroins Cherno More, and BC Yambol. He revived his career after signing with BC Yambol and became one of their leaders, playing alongside Dimitar Angelov and Stanislav Govedarov.

2009/2010
He has played 35.1 minutes average per 30 games and made 2.5 steals(74 steals in total), which makes him the best stealer in NBL. His most memorable game in this season was in double overtime win (114-112) against Levski . For 50 minutes, without being substitute, his stats were 27 points, 6 rebounds and 7 assist.

References

http://www.eurobasket.com/player.asp?Cntry=BUL&PlayerID=7387
http://yambolbasketball.com/players/players2012-13/player-radionov13.php

1979 births
Living people
BC Yambol players
BC Levski Sofia players
Bulgarian men's basketball players
PBC Academic players
Point guards